Kathryn "Kathy" Hammond (born November 2, 1951) is an American athlete who mainly competed in the 400 meters.

Hammond was born in Sacramento, California. She was a child prodigy, winning the National Indoor Championship at 440 yards in 1967, when she was just 15 year old.

She competed for the United States at the 1972 Summer Olympics held in Munich, Germany where she won the bronze medal in the women's 400 meters.  She then competed in the 4 x 400 meters where she won the silver medal with her teammates Mable Fergerson, Madeline Manning and Cheryl Toussaint.

Club Affiliation:  
Kathy Hammond represented the Sacramento Road Runners in 1971, and the Will's Spikettes in 1967-1970.
She broke the American Record at 440-yards in 52.2 8/12/1972.

In 2018, Hammond was inducted into the National Track and Field Hall of Fame.

References

 Profile at football-heroes.net 
 

American female sprinters
Olympic silver medalists for the United States in track and field
Olympic bronze medalists for the United States in track and field
Athletes (track and field) at the 1972 Summer Olympics
Track and field athletes from Sacramento, California
Living people
1951 births
Medalists at the 1972 Summer Olympics
Olympic female sprinters
20th-century American women